Mossy is an unincorporated community in Fayette County, West Virginia, United States. Mossy is located off exit 60 on the West Virginia Turnpike and is west of Oak Hill. As of 1993, the community had an Exxon gas station, and motel, all owned by Teddy Gray.

References

Unincorporated communities in Fayette County, West Virginia
Unincorporated communities in West Virginia